Rish Pass (Rishki Prohod) is a mountain pass in the Balkan Mountains (Stara Planina) in Bulgaria. It connects Shumen and Karnobat.  On the Shumen side of the pass is the village of Rish.

The Battle of the Rishki Pass was fought here in 759 between Bulgarians and Byzantines which resulted in a Bulgarian victory.

Mountain passes of Bulgaria
Balkan mountains
Landforms of Shumen Province
Landforms of Burgas Province